Giuseppe Pierre Joseph Grisoni (bapt. 24 October 1699–1769), also known as Grifoni or Grison, was an Italian painter and sculptor, noted for his landscapes and historical tableaux.

Biography
Born in Mons, he studied in Florence under Tommaso Redi, abandoning his Flemish influences for the Italian tradition. In 1715 he travelled to London with John Talman and tried to establish himself as a portrait painter. He did not achieve enough success to stay, however, and returned to Florence in 1728 to teach at the Academy of Fine Arts. In 1740, he briefly relocated to Pisa before settling in Rome where he died.

One of his pupils was William Hoare (1707–1792).

Works
Family of William Talman (National Portrait Gallery)
Self-portrait (Uffizi)
Death of St Romuald (Uffizi)
Statue of St Joseph (Florence, Church of Santissima Anunziata)
Rape of Proserpina (Uffizi)

Reference list

See also
 Gallery of works.

External links

1699 births
1769 deaths
17th-century Italian painters
Italian male painters
18th-century Italian painters
Italian sculptors
Italian male sculptors
Landscape artists
History painters
People from Mons
18th-century Italian male artists